The term senior, in regard to education, has different meanings depending on the country.

United States

In the United States education, a senior is a student in the fourth year of study, either in high school or college/university.

High school
The twelfth grade is the fourth and final year of a student's high school education. The year and the student are both referred to as senior.

Higher education
The fourth year of an undergraduate program is known as senior year, and 4th year students are known as seniors. Bachelor's degree programs are designed to be completed in four years.

Super Senior

The term super senior is used in the United States to refer to a student who has not completed graduation requirements by the end of the fourth year, who is continuing to attempt to complete said requirements.

Canada

In the province of Ontario, high school students in their third year and above are considered to be seniors, while in the province of Alberta, only twelfth graders are counted as seniors even though both provinces are Canadian (due to the fact that high school is only grades ten-twelve in Alberta).

United Kingdom

In England and Wales, students in their seventh year and above (11 years and older, post primary school) in secondary school are seniors. In Scotland, students in their fifth year and above are seniors.

Nigeria
In Nigeria, senior secondary education is the education children receive after primary  and junior secondary education and before the tertiary period.  The appropriate age for senior secondary education in Nigeria is 11–18 years. The student is expected to write (West African Examination Council — WAEC) examination and/or National Examination Council (NECO) at the completion of six years of study. Every student is examined on 8–9 subjects. All students complete 4 core cross-cutting subjects: English language, General Mathematics, Civic Education and Trade/Entrepreneurship.

See also

Freshman
Sophomore
Junior
Intercollegiate athletics

References

Educational stages
Educational years
Types of students